Mouloudia Club d'Alger, referred to as MC Alger or MCA for short, is an Algerian cycling team that was founded on 2011, as a division of the of MC Alger.

History
From 2011 to 2020, the team was known as GS Pétroliers as it was part of the multi-sports club with that name.

The team's name changed back to MC Alger in 2020.

Team roster

Major wins

2011
 Road Race Championships, Youcef Reguigui
 Time Trial Championships, Azzedine Lagab
Trophée Princier, Azzedine Lagab
Overall Tour d'Algérie, Azzedine Lagab
Stage 2, Azzedine Lagab
Stage 3, Youcef Reguigui
Circuit d'Alger, Azzedine Lagab
Stages 2 & 5 Tour du Faso Azzedine Lagab
Stage 3 Tour du Faso, Abdelmalek Madani
Stage 7 Tour du Faso, Youcef Reguigui
2012
 Road Race Championships, Azzedine Lagab
 Time Trial Championships, Azzedine Lagab
Stage 5 Tour d'Algérie, Azzedine Lagab
Challenge Ben Guerir, Abdellah Benyoucef
Heydar Aliyev Anniversary Tour, Youcef Reguigui
Stage 1 Kwita Izina Cycling Tour, Azzedine Lagab
2013
Stage 2 Fenkel Northern Red Sea, Abdelbasset Hannachi
Stage 3 Tour of Eritrea, Abdelbasset Hannachi
Circuit of Asmara, Abdellah Benyoucef
Stage 3 Tour d'Algérie, Abdelbasset Hannachi
Stage 2 Tour de Tipaza, Abdelbasset Hannachi
Stages 5 & 10 Tour du Faso, Abdelbasset Hannachi
Stages 5 & 7 Tour du Rwanda, Azzedine Lagab
2014
 Road Race Championships, Abdelbasset Hannachi
 Time Trial Championships, Azzedine Lagab
Stage 1 Tour de Blida, Azzedine Lagab
Stage 1 Tour de Constantine, Azzedine Lagab
Circuit d'Alger, Azzedine Lagab
Stage 6 Tour du Maroc, Abdelbasset Hannachi
2015
Overall Tour d'Oranie, Azzedine Lagab
Stage 2, Ayoub Karrar
Stage 2 Tour de Blida, Adil Barbari
Overall Tour d'Annaba, Abdelbasset Hannachi
Stage 1, Azzedine Lagab
Stages 2 & 3, Abdelbasset Hannachi
Stage 1 Tour de Constantine, Abdelmalek Madani
Circuit de Constantine, Azzedine Lagab
Critérium International de Blida, Abdelbasset Hannachi
Stage 2 Tour de Chlef, Abdelbasset Hannachi
2018
Stage 3 Grand Prix International de la ville d'Alger, Yacine Hamza
Overall Tour d'Algérie, Azzedine Lagab
Stage 2, Yacine Hamza
Stage 4 Tour International de la Wilaya d'Oran, Yacine Hamza
 Time Trial Championships, Azzedine Lagab
Stage 1 Tour du Rwanda, Azzedine Lagab

References

External links

 
Cycling teams established in 2011
UCI Continental Teams (Africa)
Cycling teams based in Algeria